Guo Jianqiao (born 20 July 1986) is a former Chinese-born Hong Kong professional footballer who played as a goalkeeper.

Club career
Guo was part of the Changchun Yatai youth system.

In 2008, Guo signed for Hong Kong First Division League club Happy Valley.

In 2010, Guo signed for Hong Kong First Division League club Tai Chung.

In 2011, Guo signed for Hong Kong First Division League club Kitchee.

On 1 July 2022, after 11 years with Kitchee, Guo announced his retirement from professional football.

Honours

Club
Kitchee
Hong Kong Premier League: 2014–15, 2016–17, 2017–18, 2019–20
Hong Kong First Division: 2011–12, 2013–14
Hong Kong Senior Shield: 2016–17, 2018–19
Hong Kong FA Cup: 2011–12, 2012–13, 2014–15, 2016–17, 2017–18, 2018–19
Hong Kong Sapling Cup: 2017–18, 2019–20
Hong Kong League Cup: 2011–12, 2014–15, 2015–16

References

External links
 

1986 births
Living people
Hong Kong footballers
Hong Kong Premier League players
Hong Kong First Division League players
Happy Valley AA players
Tai Chung FC players
Kitchee SC players
Association football goalkeepers